David John Scott Cook (4 August 1941 – 25 February 1993) was a British communist activist, also known as a rock climber.

Born in Warrington, Cook grew up in Solihull, and was educated at Solihull Grammar School and St Catharine's College, Cambridge, where he joined the Communist Party of Great Britain (CPGB).  He then became a teacher in Leeds and was active in the Young Communist League, eventually becoming its full-time National Organiser, based in London.

Involved in rock climbing since his school days, Cook became a prominent writer on the subject.  In particular, he championed the role of cultural history in writing on mountaineering, and on the importance of including feminist perspectives.

In 1974, Cook became the party's national election agent, then the following year, he was appointed as National Organiser of the CPGB.  In this role, he defended the Eurocommunists who were looking to change the approach of the party, and was also responsible for organising All Party Rallies with performances by Scritti Politti and Shakin' Stevens.  But by 1981, his role had been circumscribed by opponents in the party, and he left to work at a children's support union, also devoting time to the Campaign Against Racist Laws.

Cook returned to work for the CPGB in 1983, as national campaign organiser.  He stood unsuccessfully in Vauxhall at the 1983 and 1987 general elections, losing his deposit on both occasions.

The CPGB dissolved in 1991, and Cook joined its successor, Democratic Left.  In 1992, he founded the Green Socialist Network, intended to bring together socialism and environmentalism.  However, he was involved in a traffic accident the following year, while in Turkey, and died of complications soon afterwards.

References

1941 births
1993 deaths
Alumni of St Catharine's College, Cambridge
Communist Party of Great Britain members
People from Warrington